Gisèle Vallerey (22 January 1930 – 28 September 2010) was a French swimmer. She competed in two events at the 1948 Summer Olympics.

References

External links
 

1930 births
2010 deaths
French female freestyle swimmers
Olympic swimmers of France
Swimmers at the 1948 Summer Olympics
Sportspeople from Amiens